Patrick Nowlan (ca 1827 – 1896) was a merchant and political figure in Newfoundland. He represented Harbour Main from 1859 to 1865 and from 1873 to 1882 in the Newfoundland and Labrador House of Assembly.

He was born in Burgeo, where he became a trader and ship owner. Nowlan married Anne Mandeville. In the 1861 general election, the results of the election were set aside following violence at the polls; Nowlan and Thomas Byrne were later declared elected by a committee of the Newfoundland assembly.

References

External links 
 

Members of the Newfoundland and Labrador House of Assembly
1896 deaths
Year of birth uncertain
Newfoundland Colony people